Landtag elections in the Free State of Oldenburg (Freistaat Oldenburg) during the Weimar Republic were held at irregular intervals between 1919 and 1932. Results with regard to the total vote, the percentage of the vote won and the number of seats allocated to each party are presented in the tables below. On 31 March 1933, the sitting Landtag was dissolved by the Nazi-controlled central government and reconstituted to reflect the distribution of seats in the national Reichstag. The Landtag subsequently was formally abolished as a result of the "Law on the Reconstruction of the Reich" of 30 January 1934 which replaced the German federal system with a unitary state.

1919
The 1919 Oldenburg state election was held on 23 February 1919 to elect the 48 members of the constituent assembly.

1920
The 1920 Oldenburg state election was held on 6 June 1920 to elect the 48 members of the Landtag.

1923*
The 1923 Oldenburg state election was held on 10 June 1923 to elect the 48 members of the Landtag. 

*NOTE: As a result of separate elections held in Oldenburg's Birkenfeld district in May 1924, the German People's Party seats decreased to 11 and the Communist Party seats increased to 3.

1925
The 1925 Oldenburg state election was held on 24 May 1925 to elect the 40 members of the Landtag.

1928
The 1928 Oldenburg state election was held on 20 May 1928 to elect the 48 members of the Landtag.

1931
The 1931 Oldenburg state election was held on 17 May 1931 to elect the 48 members of the Landtag.

1932
The 1932 Oldenburg state election was held on 29 May 1932 to elect the 46 members of the Landtag.

References

Elections in the Weimar Republic
Elections in Lower Saxony
Oldenburg
Oldenburg
Oldenburg
Oldenburg
Oldenburg
Oldenburg
Oldenburg